Athletics is one of several sports contested at the quadrennial Commonwealth Games competition. It has been a Commonwealth Games sport since the inaugural edition of the event's precursor, the 1930 British Empire Games. It is a core sport and must be included in the sporting programme of each edition of the Games.

Editions

Events

Men's events
No new events have been added to the men's athletics programme since the 1998 addition of the 20 km and 50 km racewalks. The roster of events has not changed since then, with the exception of the omission of the 50 km racewalk from 2010 and the 20 km racewalk in 2014. A total of 35 different events have been held in the men's competition, 23 of which were contested at the 2010 Commonwealth Games in Delhi. Many of the discontinued events were similar to modern events but at different lengths as they were contested over distances measured in Imperial units. Events with distances measured in metric units were first contested in 1970.

Women's events
A total of 34 different events have been held in the women's competition, 23 of which were contested at the 2010 Commonwealth Games in Delhi. The women's program has been identical to the men's program since the 2006 Commonwealth Games (with the exception of the discontinued men's 50 km walk) when the women's 3000m steeplechase was added to the program. The 20 km racewalk was omitted from the program in 2014.

Elite Athletes with a Disability events
From the 2002 Commonwealth Games a number of events have been included in the program to include elite athletes with disabilities. The inclusion of events in this category has been inconsistent over the four Games where they have been included.

All-time medal table
Updated after the 2022 Commonwealth Games

See also
List of Commonwealth Games records in athletics
List of Commonwealth Games medallists in athletics (men)
List of Commonwealth Games medallists in athletics (women)

External links
Commonwealth Games sport index

 
Commonwealth Games
Sports at the Commonwealth Games